Tony Moore may refer to:

Tony Moore (artist) (born 1978), comic book artist on titles such as Fear Agent, The Exterminators, and The Walking Dead
Tony Moore (footballer, born 1943), English footballer
Tony Moore (footballer, born 1947) (1947–2017), English footballer
Tony Moore (musician) (born 1958), member of Cutting Crew and Iron Maiden
Tony Moore (singer), lead singer of metal band Riot
Tony P. Moore, Republican member of the North Carolina General Assembly
Tony Moore (athlete), Fijian long jumper

See also
Tony Moor (born 1940), English football goalkeeper
Anthony Moore (born 1948), music composer and producer
Antonis Mor (1517–1577), Dutch painter
Anthony Moore (politician), Oklahoma politician